Yuanying (1878 – 12 September 1953) was a Chinese Chan Buddhist master and the first Venerable Master of the Buddhist Association of China.

Biography
Yuanying was born Wu Changfa and Wu Hengchun into a family of farming background in Pinghu Township of Gutian County, in Fujian province, in 1878. His parents died when he was six and then he lived with his uncle. At the age of 10, he aspired to become a Buddhist monk, but his uncle did not approve. By age 18, he attended the Imperial examination and became a xiucai. One year later, he received ordination as a monk at Meifeng Temple in Fuzhou under master Zeng Xi and then received prātimokṣa under master Miao Lian at Yongquan Temple. When he was 21, he began to learn Chan Buddhism under master Ye Kai, he stayed with his teacher for four years. At the age of 25, he resided in Tiantong Temple with his teacher Bazhi Toutuo.

In 1908, he settled at Yongquan Temple, in Quanzhou, where he taught Chan Buddhism, and attracted large numbers of practitioners. In 1909, he became the abbot of Jiedai Temple. In 1912, the Chinese Buddhist Association was founded and he was elected a councilor. In 1917, Yuanying was elected Venerable Master of the Buddhist Association of Ningbo, he establish two schools to promote the development of local education project. He spread Chan Buddhism in Beijing in 1920 and then in Singapore and Penang Island in 1922. In 1923, Yuanying returned to Quanzhou, he rebuilt the Kaiyuan Temple and founded kindergarten in the temple, which adopted more than 200 orphans. In 1926, Yuanying went to Southeast Asia again to collect donations. In 1928, the Nationalist government issued the "Administrative Regulations of Religious Temples", an Anti - Buddhism Movement swept over the country. In 1929, along with Taixu and others, Yuanying formed the China Buddhist Association in Shanghai where he was President. They signed a large petition calling for stopping the destruction of Buddhism. In 1930, Yuanying became the abbot of Tiantong Temple, where he taught Chan Buddhism for six years. In 1937, he was the abbot of Yongquan Temple, at the age of 60. On July 7, the Marco Polo Bridge Incident broke out, Yuanying organized an ambulance corps for to serve the Nationalists. In October, he went to Singapore to collect money for the military expenditures. In the autumn of 1939, Yuanying returned to Shanghai and settled at Yuanming Lecture Room, he was soon arrested by the Japanese military police corps, he was mistreated and tortured. Shanghai people from all walks of life to rescue him, under pressure, the Japanese had to release him. In 1943 former Beiyang government prime minister Jin Yunpeng invited him to Tianjin to preach. In 1945, he founded the Yuanming Lengyan School, where he served as president and expound the texts of Laṅkāvatāra Sūtra.

After the establishment of the Communist State in 1951, Yuanying attended the Asia and Pacific Regional Peace Conference in Beijing. In 1953, Hsu Yun formed the Buddhist Association of China at Kuang Chi (Extensive Aid) Monastery, Yuanying was elected its first Venerable Master. On September 12, he died of esophagus cancer at Tiantong Temple, in Ningbo, Zhejiang province, aged 76.

Further reading
In 2014, a historical drama film based on the early boyhood of Yuanying was shot in his hometown.

References

External links

1878 births
1953 deaths
People from Ningde
Rinzai Buddhists
Chan Buddhists
Chinese Zen Buddhists
Republic of China Buddhist monks
People's Republic of China Buddhist monks
Qing dynasty Buddhist monks
19th-century Chinese people
20th-century Chinese people
Religious leaders in China